Castle Toot, or Cleobury Castle, was a motte castle by the River Rea in the town of Cleobury Mortimer, Shropshire. It is a scheduled monument, first listed in 1951.

The castle was built in the early 12th century and owned by the Mortimer family. Hugh de Mortimer rebelled against Henry II and as a result the castle was destroyed in 1155.

The earthworks remain largely intact. Towards the end of the 18th century, some stonework of the entrance and causeway to the castle was visible, but has now presumably been buried or dismantled. There have been no archaeological finds at the site, despite excavations for building works being made in recent years.

References

Castles in Shropshire
Cleobury Mortimer